Sephardic Tinge is an album by pianist Anthony Coleman which was released on the Tzadik label in 1995.

Reception

In his review for Allmusic, Marc Gilman notes that "Sephardic Tinge is an excellent incorporation of traditional, ethnic music combined with an astute downtown New York sensibility".

Track listing
All compositions by Anthony Coleman except as indicated
 "Quando el Rey Nimrod" (Traditional) - 4:04   
 "Bye-Ya" (Thelonious Monk) - 5:14   
 "Ladino Passacaglia" - 5:10   
 "Belz" (Alexander Olshanetsky, Jacob Jacobs) - 4:56   
 "Bert Williams" (Jelly Roll Morton) - 4:08   
 "Sarajevo" - 4:20   
 "Doina" - 8:08   
 "Ask Anthony 2" (Coleman, Greg Cohen, Joey Baron) - 6:18   
 "Una Matica de Ruda" (Traditional) - 6:31

Personnel
Anthony Coleman - piano
Greg Cohen - bass
Joey Baron - drums

References

Tzadik Records albums
Anthony Coleman albums
1995 albums